Martin Bergvold (born 20 February 1984) is a Danish former professional footballer, who played as a midfielder. He has played 18 games and scored two goals for the Denmark under-21 national team, and was named 2000 Danish Under-17 Player of the Year.

Career
Bergvold started playing football with small clubs Rødovre Boldklub and Boldklubben Avarta. He moved to Kjøbenhavns Boldklub (KB), the reserve team of FC Copenhagen of the top-flight Danish Superliga. Bergvold played for various Danish national teams, regularly featuring as team captain, and he won the 2000 Danish Under-17 Player of the Year award.

He made his senior debut for Copenhagen in December 2002, and was a member of the squad which won the 2002–03 Superliga championship. He scored his first goal for the club in March 2004, as the club repeated the championship win in the 2003–04 Superliga season. He also scored in the 2004 Danish Cup tournament, though he did not play the cup final, which Copenhagen won 1–0 against AaB. Bergvold played 22 of Copenhagen's 33 games in the 2005–06 Superliga season, which the club went on to win, and he was selected to represent the Danish under-21 national team at the 2006 European Under-21 Championship in May 2006. He played in all Denmark's three matches before elimination.

In January 2007, he moved abroad to play for Italian club Livorno. He made his debut in the Serie A in a 1–2 loss to Fiorentina on 28 January. Livorno finished last in the 2007–08 Serie A season, and was relegated to the Serie B. Bergvold stayed at Livorno, and made 30 appearances in the 2008–09 Serie B season to help Livorno win promotion for the Serie A.

After playing a few years in Denmark, where he played for Copenhagen, Lyngby, Esbjerg fB and Vendsyssel FF, he returned to Livorno in 2016.

In February 2017, Bergvold moved to Faroese club HB Tórshavn. After making 11 appearances for the side and scoring one goal, he retired from football.

Honours
FC Copenhagen
Danish Superliga: 2002–03, 2003–04, 2005–06, 2010–11
Danish Cup: 2003–04
Royal League: 2004–05, 2005–06

Individual
Danish Under-17 Player of the Year: 2000

References

External links
 
 
 La Gazzetta dello Sport profile

1984 births
Living people
Danish men's footballers
Danish expatriate men's footballers
Denmark under-21 international footballers
Denmark youth international footballers
Denmark international footballers
Association football midfielders
BK Avarta players
F.C. Copenhagen players
U.S. Livorno 1915 players
Lyngby Boldklub players
Esbjerg fB players
Vendsyssel FF players
Havnar Bóltfelag players
Danish Superliga players
Danish 1st Division players
Serie A players
Serie B players
Serie C players
Faroe Islands Premier League players
Expatriate footballers in Italy
Danish expatriate sportspeople in Italy
Footballers from Copenhagen